Acton is a suburb of Canberra, ACT, Australia. Acton covers an area west of the CBD, bordered by Black Mountain to the west and Lake Burley Griffin in the south. The Australian National University campus covers most of the suburb, though also located in Acton is the National Film and Sound Archive, a branch of the CSIRO and the National Museum of Australia.

At the  Acton had a population of 2,848 people, mostly students living at the Australian National University.

History

Acton was inhabited by Aboriginal Australian groups for thousands of years before European occupation. Part of this history is documented by the ANU Aboriginal and Torres Strait Islander Heritage Trail. Sullivans Creek, which flows through Acton, provided a culturally significant source of food and resources for Aboriginal people. According to historian Bill Gammage, part of the area now used as the South Oval was purposely deforested by Aboriginal people, to form a grassland area that may have been used for hunting kangaroos, camping, or as an area to await smoke signals from nearby. Scarred trees in Acton suggest that their bark provided a valuable resource.

The suburb is named in recognition of one of the region's original homesteads 'Acton' which was sited near the present-day National Museum at the end of Liversidge Street.

With the establishment of the Federal Capital in 1911, territory administrators erected a temporary workers camp in the vicinity of 'Acton Homestead', since demolished, to house staff coordinating the development of the National Capital. The chief Surveyor Scrivener occupied Acton Homestead at an early stage during his survey of the capital site. The Bachelors' Quarters above Lennox Crossing, now renamed Lennox House, became the city's first guest house.

The alignment of Liversidge Street and Lennox Crossing follows the original line of the pre-1911 road towards the major ford across the Molonglo River. A low bridge and causeway was erected in 1911, at the site of the original river ford in an area subsequently inundated by Lake Burley Griffin.

The Acton Tunnel was built below a hill in the suburb between 1976 and 1979 as part on an extension of Parkes Way.

In 2011 a proposal was launched to build the Australia Forum, a major convention centre complex, on the lake shoreline in Acton.

Demographics
In 2011, 56.9% of the population was foreign-born, the highest for any Canberra suburb.

Geology

The southern part of Acton has a complicated arrangement of sediments that include the Pittman Formation greywacke and the black-coloured Acton Shale Member from the Ordovician age.  Then from the Silurian age there is mudstone, State Circle Shale, and Camp Hill Sandstone.  Some limestone is found near the National Museum of Australia.

Calcareous shales from the Canberra Formation are overlain by Quaternary alluvium on the north. This rock is the limestone of the original title of Canberra, "Limestone Plains". Tertiary-age pebbly gravels are left from when the Molonglo river was at a higher level.

Notes and references

Suburbs of Canberra